Haroon Arshad (born 6 September 1999) is a Hong Kong cricketer. He made his first-class debut for Hong Kong in the 2015–17 ICC Intercontinental Cup on 20 October 2017.

In August 2018, he was named in Hong Kong's squad for the 2018 Asia Cup Qualifier tournament, but he did not play. Hong Kong won the qualifier tournament, and he was then named in Hong Kong's squad for the 2018 Asia Cup, and again he did not play.

In October 2018, he was the leading run-scorer for Hong Kong in the 2018 ACC Under-19 Asia Cup, with 52 runs in three matches. In September 2019, he was named in Hong Kong's Twenty20 International (T20I) squad for the 2019–20 Oman Pentangular Series, and the 2019 ICC T20 World Cup Qualifier tournament in the United Arab Emirates. He made his T20I debut for Hong Kong, against Oman, on 5 October 2019. Ahead of the T20 qualifier tournament, the International Cricket Council (ICC) named him as the player to watch in Hong Kong's squad.

In November 2019, he was named in Hong Kong's squad for the 2019 ACC Emerging Teams Asia Cup in Bangladesh. He made his List A debut for Hong Kong, against Bangladesh, in the Emerging Teams Cup on 14 November 2019. Later that same month, he was named in Hong Kong's squad for the Cricket World Cup Challenge League B tournament in Oman.

On 1 March 2020, in the Eastern Region group match against Nepal in the 2020 Asia Cup Qualifier tournament, he became the first bowler for Hong Kong to take a five-wicket haul in a T20I match. In May 2022, he was named in Hong Kong's side for the 2022 Uganda Cricket World Cup Challenge League B tournament.

References

External links
 

1999 births
Living people
Hong Kong cricketers
Hong Kong Twenty20 International cricketers
Place of birth missing (living people)